Francesco Sfondrati (1493–1550) was an Italian Roman Catholic bishop and cardinal and the father of Pope Gregory XIV.

Biography

Francesco Sfondrati was born in Cremona on 26 October 1493, the son of Cremonan patricians Giovanni Battista Sfrondati and Margherita Homodeo.

Sfondrati studied Ancient Greek and Latin as a young man and then received a doctorate of law from the University of Pavia.  In 1518, he became a professor of public law at the University of Padua.  He would later work as a professor at the University of Pavia, the University of Bologna, the Sapienza University of Rome, and the University of Turin.  He was a counselor of Charles III, Duke of Savoy and a member of the senate of Turin.  In 1527 and 1528, he was Podestà of Pavia.  He was later a counselor of Francesco II Sforza, joining the senate of Milan in 1530.

Charles V, Holy Roman Emperor then named Sfondrati to the Aulic Council.  He was also Charles V's ambassador to the Duke of Savoy. On 23 October 1537 the emperor made him Graf of Riviera di Lecco.  He also served as governor of Siena.

Sfondrati was married to Anna Visconti, a member of the House of Visconti.  Together, the couple had seven children, including Niccolò Sfondrati, who became Pope Gregory XIV.

Following his wife's death on 20 November 1538, Sfondrati entered the clerical state.  He quickly became a protonotary apostolic participantium.  He also became a Referendary of the Apostolic Signatura.

On 12 October 1543 he was elected Bishop of Sarno. Pope Paul III then despatched Bishop Sfondrati as nuncio to Ferdinand, King of the Romans and the other princes of the Holy Roman Empire to discuss peace with the Kingdom of France and to promote the forthcoming ecumenical council.  Sfondrati was promoted to the metropolitan see of Amalfi on 27 October 1544.  He then served as nuncio to the Diet of Speyer (1544) to congratulate the emperor on his peace agreement with Francis I of France.

Pope Paul III made him a cardinal priest in the consistory of 19 December 1544.  He received the red hat and the titular church of Santi Nereo e Achilleo on 2 March 1545.  He also made him a member of the Roman Inquisition.

On 25 February 1547 the pope made Cardinal Sfondrati papal legate to the emperor to discuss plans for dealing with the Kingdom of England following the death of Henry VIII of England.  This legation lasted until June 1548.

On 23 March 1547 he was transferred to the see of Capaccio.  He opted for the titular church of Sant'Anastasia on 10 October 1547. On 9 November 1549 he was transferred to the see of Cremona.

He participated in the 1549–1550 papal conclave that elected Pope Julius III.

He died in Cremona on 31 July 1550.  He was buried in Cremona Cathedral.

References

External links
 Sfondrati family papers, MSS 519 at L. Tom Perry Special Collections, Brigham Young University

1493 births
1550 deaths
16th-century Italian cardinals
Clergy from Cremona